École Bois-Joli is a Canadian French public school in Dartmouth, Nova Scotia. It is operated by Conseil scolaire acadien provincial.

After grade 4, students will continue their studies at École du Carrefour.

Elementary schools in Nova Scotia
Schools in Halifax, Nova Scotia